Mártires Department is a  department of Chubut Province in Argentina.

The provincial subdivision has a population of about 977 inhabitants in an area of 15,445 km².

Settlements
Las Plumas
El Mirasol
Mina Chubut
La Rosada
Alto de las Plumas
Laguna Grande
Sierra Negra

1921 establishments in Argentina
Departments of Chubut Province